Carex brizoides, the quaking sedge or quaking-grass sedge, is a species in the genus Carex, native to central and southern Europe. Even where it is a native species, in disturbed woodlands it tends to behave invasively, forming a thick layer on the forest floor and reducing species diversity.

References

brizoides
Flora of Europe
Taxa named by Carl Linnaeus
Plants described in 1755